Naman Patel is a Kenyan cricketer. In November 2019, he was named in Kenya's squad for the Cricket World Cup Challenge League B tournament in Oman. He made his List A debut, for Kenya against Italy, on 3 December 2019.

References

External links
 

Year of birth missing (living people)
Living people
Kenyan cricketers
Place of birth missing (living people)